The Churchill Museum may be one of the following entities associated with Winston Churchill:
 Chartwell, the principal adulthood home of Sir Winston Churchill, administered by the National Trust
 Churchill Archives Centre, in the grounds of Churchill College, Cambridge, England
 The Churchill War Rooms, a museum in London
 National Churchill Library and Center (NCLC), a public library and museum at the George Washington University in Washington, D.C.
 The National Churchill Museum (formerly the Winston Churchill Memorial and Library), located on the Westminster College campus in Fulton, Missouri